Tattoo Redo was an American reality television series which premiered on Netflix on July 28, 2021.

Premise 
Hosted by comedian Jessimae Peluso, Tattoo Redo features the horror stories behind botched tattoos and the efforts of professional artists (Tommy Montoya, Miryam Lumpini, Rose Hardy, Matt Beckerich, and Twig Sparks) to execute cover-ups. The cover-up tattoos, co-designed by family members or loved ones, are kept secret from the subjects (via a screened partition) until the tattoo is completed.

Reception 
Upon its initial release, Tattoo Redo opened to mixed to positive reviews after debuting in Netflix's Top 10. Lucy Mangan of The Guardian wrote "the whole thing is ridiculously charming... Tattoo Redo manages to sidestep the elephant traps and stay light, breezy and really rather endearing, even before you add the joy of watching people create something from nothing." Daniel Hart of Ready Steady Cut called it "easy and cruel entertainment... the horrifying becomes even more horrifying, but from a reality TV perspective, it is glorious." Martin Brown of Common Sense Media said "There's a little thrill that happens every time a bad tattoo gets revealed...otherwise, Tattoo Redo often feels like a missed opportunity." Joel Keller of Decider judged the show as "Stream It!" (in Decider's "Stream It or Skip It!" column) and deemed it "a fun makeover show that sets the right tone by making fun of the awful tattoos people get while celebrating the artists that do an expert job of covering them up."

Episodes

References

External links
 

2021 American television series debuts
2021 American television series endings
2020s American reality television series
English-language Netflix original programming
Tattooing television series
Television shows filmed in Los Angeles